The Ethiopian Highlands (also called the Abyssinian Highlands) is a rugged mass of mountains in Ethiopia in Northeast Africa. It is sometimes called the Roof of Africa due to its height and large area. Most of the Ethiopian Highlands are part of central and northern Ethiopia, and its northernmost portion reaches into Eritrea.

History

In the southern parts of the Ethiopian Highlands once was located the Kingdom of Kaffa, a medieval early modern state, whence the coffee plant was exported to the Arabian Peninsula. The land of the former kingdom is mountainous with stretches of forest. The land is very fertile, capable of three harvests a year.

Physical geography

The Highlands are divided into northwestern and southeastern portions by the Main Ethiopian Rift, which contains a number of salt lakes. The northwestern portion, known as the Abyssinian Massif, covers the Tigray and Amhara Regions, and includes the Semien Mountains, part of which has been designated the Simien Mountains National Park. Its summit, Ras Dashen (4,550 m), is the highest peak in Ethiopia. Lake Tana, the source of the Blue Nile, also lies in the northwestern portion of the Ethiopian Highlands.

The southeastern portion is known as the Harar Massif. Its highest peaks are located in the Bale Zone of Ethiopia's Oromia Region. The Bale Mountains, also designated a national park, are nearly as high as those of Semien. The range includes peaks of over 4,000 m. Among these are Mount Tullu Demtu (4,337 m), which is the second-highest major independent mountain in Ethiopia, and Mount Batu (4,307 m).

Geology

The Ethiopian Highlands began to rise 75 million years ago, as magma from the Earth's mantle uplifted a broad dome of the ancient rocks of the Arabian-Nubian Shield. The opening of the Great Rift Valley split the dome of the Ethiopian Highlands into three parts; the mountains of the southern Arabian Peninsula are geologically part of the ancient Ethiopian Highlands, separated by the rifting which created the Red Sea and Gulf of Aden and separated Africa from Arabia.

Around 30 million years ago, a flood basalt plateau began to form, piling layers upon layers of voluminous fissure-fed basaltic lava flows. Most of the flows were tholeiitic, save for a thin layer of alkali basalts and minor amounts of felsic (high-silica) volcanic rocks, such as rhyolite. In the waning stages of the flood basalt episode, large explosive caldera-forming eruptions also occurred.

The Ethiopian Highlands were eventually bisected by the Great Rift Valley as the African continental crust pulled apart. This rifting gave rise to large alkaline basalt shield volcanoes beginning about 30–31 million years ago.

The northern Ethiopian Highlands contain four discernible planation surfaces, the oldest one being formed not later than in the Ordovician Period. The youngest surface formed in the Cenozoic, being partly covered by the Ethiopia-Yemen Continental Flood Basalts. Contrary to what has been suggested for much of Africa, planation surfaces in northern Ethiopia do not appear to be pediplains nor etchplains.

Climate

The predominant climate of the Ethiopian Highlands is the Alpine climate.

Because the highlands elevate Ethiopia, located close to the equator, this has resulted in giving this country an unexpectedly temperate climate. Further, these mountains catch the precipitation of the monsoon winds of the Indian Ocean, resulting in a rainy season that lasts from June until mid-September. These heavy rains cause the Nile to flood in the summer, a phenomenon that puzzled the ancient Greeks, as the summer is the driest season in the Mediterranean climate that they knew.

Ecology

The Ethiopian Highlands share a similar flora and fauna of other mountainous regions of Africa; this distinctive flora and fauna is known as Afromontane but from the time of the last ice age has been populated with some Eurasian (palearctic) flora. The habitats are somewhat different on either side of the Great Rift Valley that splits the highlands.

At lower elevations, the highlands are surrounded by tropical savannas and grasslands, including the Sahelian Acacia savanna to the northwest and the East Sudanian savanna to the west. .

The highlands themselves are divided into three distinct ecoregions, distinguished by elevation. The Ethiopian montane forests lie between 1,100 and 1,800 meters elevation, above the lowland grasslands and savannas, and extends to areas of similar habitat in Eritrea, Sudan, and Djibouti. This woodland belt has several natural plant communities, but has mostly been heavily grazed and converted to agricultural use now. Kolla, is an open woodland found at lower elevations, and dominated by species of Terminalia, Commiphora, Boswellia, and Acacia. Weyna dega is a woodland found in moister and higher locations, dominated by the conifers Afrocarpus gracilior and Juniperus procera. The lower portion of the Harenna Forest is a distinct woodland community, with an open canopy of Warburgia ugandensis, Croton macrostachyus, and Syzygium guineense, and Afrocarpus gracilior, with wild coffee (Coffea arabica) as the dominant understory shrub. The southwesterly winds bring rainfall from May to October with moisture from the Red Sea coming in from the east year round.
Fauna at these elevations includes the endemic Harwood's spurfowl (Pternistis harwoodi), Prince Ruspoli's turaco (Tauraco ruspolii) and yellow-throated seedeater (Serinus flavigula)

The Ethiopian montane grasslands and woodlands is the largest of the highland ecoregions, occupying the area between 1,800 and 3,000 meters elevation. The natural vegetation was closed-canopy forest in moister areas, and grassland, bushland, and thicket in drier areas. However these hillsides have good fertile soil and are heavily populated, largely by farming communities, so most of the region has been converted to agriculture with a few areas of natural vegetation remaining. Urban areas in this ecoregion include: Ethiopia's capital city and Africa's fourth largest city Addis Ababa, the Amhara Region capital Bahir Dar with its island monasteries on Lake Tana, the old walled city of Harar, the spa town of Ambo, Asella in the Arsi Zone, the trekking center of Dodola, the lakeside Bishoftu, the largest city in the southwest Jimma, the market town of Nekemte, and the capital of the Tigray Region, Mek'ele. Awash National Park is a site for birdwatching.

Remaining woodland in the drier areas contains much endemic flora and primarily consists of the conifers Afrocarpus falcatus and Juniperus procera, often with the broadleaved Hagenia abyssinica. In the Harenna Forest, pockets of moist, closed-canopy forest with Pouteria and Olea are draped with lianas and epiphytes, while above 2400 meters, a shrubby zone is home to Hagenia, Schefflera, and giant lobelias (Lobelia gibberroa), species which can be found on the East African mountains further south. The evergreen broadleaved forest of the Semien Mountains, between 2,300 and 2,700 meters elevation, is dominated by Syzygium guineense, Juniperus procera, and Olea africana.

As the lower slopes of the mountains are so heavily populated, even the high altitude moorlands are affected by human interference, such as the grazing of livestock and even farming. There are two protected areas of high moorland: Bale Mountains National Park in the southern highlands, accessible from Dinsho; and Simien Mountains National Park, accessible from Gondar, which includes Ras Dashen. However, even these parks are losing habitat to livestock grazing, while the lower elevation parks (Harar Wildlife Sanctuary, Awash National Park, Omo National Park, and Nechisar National Park) are even less secure.

Above 3,000 meters elevation lie the high Ethiopian montane moorlands, the largest Afroalpine region in Africa. The montane moorlands lie above the tree line, and consist of grassland and moorland with abundant herbs and some shrubs that have adapted to the high mountain conditions.

Fauna
These slopes are home to a number of endemic wildlife species, including the endangered walia ibex (Capra walie) and the gelada baboon, whose thick fur allows it to thrive in the cooler climates of the mountains. These two species are only found on the northern side of the valley, while another rare endemic, the mountain nyala (Tragelaphus buxtoni) is restricted to the southern side, and now survives at higher altitudes than its original habitat since the lower slopes are heavily farmed. More widespread mammals found here include the mantled guereza (Colobus guereza), which is also threatened as its habitat disappears as does that of many other mammals of the highlands such as olive baboon (Papio anubis), Egyptian wolf (Canis aureus), leopard (Panthera pardus), lion (Panthera leo), spotted hyena (Crocuta crocuta), caracal (Caracal caracal), serval (Leptailurus serval), common duiker (Sylvicapra grimmia), and giant forest hog (Hylochoerus meinertzhageni). Birds include Rueppell's chat, the finch Ankober serin (Serinus ankoberensis), white-winged flufftail (Sarothrura ayresi), and blue-winged goose. The farmland is home to many butterflies, especially Papilio, Charaxinae, Pieridae and Lycaenidae.

There are several endemic animal species, one of which, the Ethiopian wolf (Canis simensis), is critically endangered. Other endemics include the big-headed mole-rat (Tachyoryctes macrocephalus) which is common on the Sanetti Plateau in the Bale Mountains. The mountain nyala finds its way up to the high moorlands although it is more common at lower elevations. Wintering birds include wigeon (Anas penelope), shoveler (Anas clypeata), ruff (Philomachus pugnax), and greenshank (Tringa nebularia).

Other fauna in the area also includes aardvark, eagle, Egyptian wolf, gelada, secretarybird, Nubian ibex, and marabou stork and Ethiopian endemic species such as the shrew (Crocidura harenna), the narrow-footed woodland mouse (Grammomys minnae), and Menelik's bushbuck (Tragelaphus scriptus meneliki), which is a subspecies with long, dark fur.

See also
 Geography of Ethiopia
 Wildlife of Ethiopia
 The Great Rift Valley
 Australopithecus

References

External links
 
 
 
 Ethiopian Wolf Conservation Programme 

 
Regions of Africa
Mountain ranges of Ethiopia
Geography of Ethiopia
Forests of Ethiopia
Afromontane ecoregions
Ecoregions of Ethiopia
Ecoregions of Sudan
Amhara Region
Geography of Oromia Region
Tigray Region
Large igneous provinces
Oligocene volcanism
Oligocene Africa
Ecoregions of Africa
Plateaus of Africa
Highlands
Freshwater ecoregions of Africa